Suffern High School is a public high school in the Suffern Central School District (formerly known as the Ramapo Central School District) located in Suffern, New York. The school's mascot is a mountain lion (Mountie). Its yearbook is the Panorama. In 2015, Newsweek magazine ranked Suffern High in the top 500 high schools in the United States at number 439.

Academics
Suffern High School offers many honors level classes, AP classes, and classes affiliated with the Syracuse University Project Advance program, the University of Cambridge, and SUNY Albany are offered as well.

Athletics
Suffern High offers many sports throughout the year that take place both on and off campus; the school sports team is the Mounties. Some sports games are played at Suffern Middle School, located close to the high school. The following sports are available at Suffern (boys and girls teams are available unless noted):

Cross country
Football (boys)
Soccer
Volleyball
Field hockey (girls)
Cheerleading (girls)
Swimming
Basketball
Bowling
Ice hockey (boys)
Indoor track
Wrestling (boys)
Gymnastics (girls)
Skiing 
Tennis
Track & field
Crew
Baseball (boys)
Softball (girls)
Lacrosse
Golf

Hockey
On March 11, 2012 Suffern High School won the  New York State Public High School Athletic Association (NYSPHSAA) state Hockey championship.

Notable alumni

 Christine Andreas (1969), award-winning Broadway performer and cabaret singer.
 Tony DeFrancesco, former MLB interim manager with the Houston Astros
 Mary Frances Gunner (1911), playwright
Dan Gurewitch (2002), writer and comedian, perhaps best known for CollegeHumor.
 Hendrik Hertzberg – Chief speechwriter for President Jimmy Carter.
 Sidney Hertzberg – New York Knicks basketball player
 Howard Hoffman (1972), broadcast performer in New York City, Los Angeles and San Francisco.
 Joe Lockhart – Press Secretary for President Bill Clinton
 Thomas Meehan – Tony award winner book writer of Annie and The Producers
 Walt Weiss – Former Major League Baseball player and former manager of the Colorado Rockies.

References

External links
 
 Suffern Central School District

1904 establishments in New York (state)
Educational institutions established in 1904
Public high schools in New York (state)
Schools in Rockland County, New York